Illinois Route 35 (IL 35) is a  connector road between U.S. Route 20 (US 20) in East Dubuque and Highway 35 at the Wisconsin state line. It is currently the shortest state highway in Illinois, a stark contrast to the highway north of the state line, which is Wisconsin's longest highway.

Route description 
IL 35 begins at a four-way urban intersection in East Dubuque. US 20 passes overhead and connects to the intersection via an exit ramp. From here, IL 35 heads northeast out of East Dubuque on a curving route. Within East Dubuque, IL 35 is locally known as Wisconsin Avenue. Once it leaves East Dubuque, IL 35 becomes a primarily rural road, which it remains for the rest of its route. The highway passes County Route 5W shortly before becoming WIS 35 at the Wisconsin state line. IL 35 is an undivided two-lane road for its entire length.

History 
SBI Route 35 was originally a shorter road from Mound City to what is now U.S. Route 51. This road was  (1.6 km) and served a federal cemetery. By 1934, Illinois Route 147 was extended all the way to US 51, replacing IL 35. By 1936, Illinois Route 37 entirely acquired IL 147 south of Marion. In 1938, the number was assigned to the modern-day routing, which had previously been IL 79.

From 1971 to 1982, U.S. Route 61 and U.S. Route 151 ran on Illinois 35 due to the Eagle Point Bridge closure upstream on the Mississippi River. This is the only time that U.S. 61 and U.S. 151 have had alignments in Illinois.

Major intersections

References 

035
U.S. Route 61
Transportation in Jo Daviess County, Illinois